Remeţi Hydro Power Plant is a large power plant on the Drăgan River situated in Romania.

The project was started and finished in the 1980s and it was made up by the construction of a concrete arch dam 120 m high which was equipped with two hydrounits, the hydropower plant having an installed capacity of 100 MW.

The power plant generates 200 GWh of electricity per year.

See also

Porţile de Fier I
Porţile de Fier II

External links
Description 

Hydroelectric power stations in Romania
Dams in Romania